Max Gilardi (born January 28, 1988), also known as Max G and or by his Internet pseudonym HotDiggedyDemon, is an American animator, voice actor, artist, and YouTuber. He is best known for his PONY.MOV web series, a parody of the popular children's animated television series My Little Pony: Friendship Is Magic, and his media analysis series Brain Dump.

Early life and education
Gilardi was born in Massachusetts in 1988. He attended the Art Institute of Boston briefly before dropping out.

Career
Gilardi, under the name "HotDiggedyDemon", first started creating Flash animations in the early 2000s on Newgrounds.com. In 2007, he began uploading his work to his YouTube channel as well. That year, he created the "Jerry" series, an animated web series detailing the terrible life of a man named Jerry.

In 2010, he created the "Wacky Game Jokez, 4 Kidz!" series, also known as "WGJ4K", featuring video game-based humor. In addition to creating animations, he co-hosted the Wisenheimers podcast with fellow animator Yotam Perel from 2010 to 2012.

From 2011 to 2013, he gained notability for releasing his six-part video parody of My Little Pony: Friendship Is Magic, "PONY.MOV", an adult animated dark comedy web series in the art style of John Kricfalusi and Spümcø's The Ren & Stimpy Show. The series grew as a spin-off of Gilardi's Tumblr webcomic, "Ask ", and each video highlights a different character from the main cast of the television series.

He also gained notability for his parodies for video games like Five Nights at Freddy's, Cuphead, and Animal Crossing, due to their dark nature. The Animal Crossing parody has Isabelle, an innocent character in the game, worshiping Karl Marx.

Gilardi has over one million subscribers on YouTube. The majority of his videos are self-made: written, animated, and voiced by himself. In his more recent projects, he has experimented with 3D animation. On September 2, 2016, Gilardi launched a new YouTube series titled "Brain Dump" in which he reviews movies, often satirically. The series has since become the main series on Gilardi's channel with an overarching narrative featuring a ghost called Goofball and a living television called Burnbot.

Gilardi has cited Craig McCracken, Matt Groening, John Kricfalusi, Jhonen Vasquez, Danny Antonucci, Genndy Tartakovsky, United Productions of America, Hanna-Barbera, Junji Ito, Akira Toriyama, Bill Watterson, and early Charles Schulz as influences on his art and animation.

References

External links
 Official website
 

1988 births
American animators
American storyboard artists
21st-century American comedians
American male comedians
American male voice actors
American podcasters
American YouTubers
Animators from Massachusetts
Comedy YouTubers
Flash artists
YouTube animators
Living people
Surreal comedy
YouTube channels launched in 2007
Newgrounds people